Colbert County Schools is the school system serving Colbert County, Alabama. As of 2021 Chris Hand was superintendent.

Member schools
Cherokee Elementary School
Cherokee High School
 Hatton Elementary School
Leighton Elementary School
Colbert County High School
Colbert Heights Elementary School
Colbert Heights High School
New Bethel Elementary School

Previous schools (closed)
Cherokee Middle School closed in 2007.
Underwood Elementary School
Barton Elementary School

External links
Colbert County Schools

School districts in Alabama
Education in Colbert County, Alabama